The 2018 Cadel Evans Great Ocean Road Race was a road cycling one-day race that took place on 28 January 2018 in Australia. It was the fourth edition of the Cadel Evans Great Ocean Road Race and the second event of the 2018 UCI World Tour.

Teams
As the race was only added to the UCI World Tour calendar in 2017, all UCI WorldTeams were invited to the race, but not obligated to compete in the race. As such, twelve of the eighteen WorldTeams competed in the race, down one on 2017. Three UCI Professional Continental teams competed – also one fewer than 2017 – while an Australian national squad completed the 16-team peloton.

Result

References

External links
 

Cadel Evans Great Ocean Road Race
Cadel Evans Great Ocean Road Race
Cadel Evans Great Ocean Road Race
Cadel Evans Great Ocean Road Race